Exosquad is a Sega Genesis video game based on the animated television series under the same title and developed by Appaloosa Interactive (formerly Novotrade International).

Gameplay

The player alternatively assumes the roles of three members of the Able Squad: Lt. J.T. Marsh, Sgt. Rita Torres and Wolf Bronsky. Depending on the character, the gameplay alternates between "a shooter, a platformer, and a fighting game" genres.

Reception
Exosquad was negatively received by critics. GamePro gave the game a mostly negative review, saying that the three different gameplay styles provide variety but all have major issues: "In the space-shooter levels, detecting oncoming meteorites and Neo missiles is excruciatingly tough because of the star-studded backgrounds. The ground attacks, on the other hand, are a slowly moving breeze; your E-Frame lumbers along the landscape to eliminate equally pokey enemies. The one-on-one fighting offers an intriguing mix of air-to-air, surface-to-air, and air-to-surface attacks, but they're frustrating because of molasses-like controls." They also argued that the game is much too difficult for the young audiences of the TV show. A reviewer for Next Generation gave it one out of five stars, saying that the controls are unacceptably poor and the use of separate sprites for each of the characters' segments results in "gangly" and awkward animations. The four reviewers of Electronic Gaming Monthly complimented the cinematic intro but otherwise panned the game, saying that the controls were poor, the graphics were outdated, and the developers had divided their attentions between several different gameplay styles without doing a good job with any of them. They gave it a score of 3.75 out of 10.

References

External links
 Further links

1995 video games
Appaloosa Interactive games
Military science fiction video games
Sega Genesis games
Sega Genesis-only games
Video games based on animated television series
Video games developed in Hungary